Zomergasten ("Summer guests", an allusion to migratory birds) is a Dutch television programme broadcast each summer by public broadcaster VPRO. 

The programme was first aired in 1988. Each episode takes up an entire Sunday evening, lasting typically three hours. It consists of an in-depth studio interview with a notable Dutch, Belgian or other Dutch-speaking foreigner, interspersed with cinema or television footage selected by the guest, which is subsequently discussed. Guests include writers, scientists, television personalities, politicians or business people. 

Zomergasten has become one of the signature programmes of Dutch public television. VPRO has organized live public screenings of Zomergasten in arthouse cinemas. In 2017, several venues in Amsterdam organised public screenings of the Zomergasten edition featuring Amsterdam mayor Eberhard van der Laan.

Guests included: Ilja Leonard Pfeijffer (2020), Eberhard van der Laan (2017), Arjen Lubach (2016), Reinbert de Leeuw (2014), Paul Verhoeven (2010), Jaap van Zweden (2009), Bram Moszkowicz (2007), Robbert Dijkgraaf (2005), Theo Maassen (2004), Britta Böhler (2003), Sonja Barend (1999), Arnon Grunberg (1997), Harry Mulisch (1995), Sienie Strikwerda (1988).

References

1988 Dutch television series debuts
Dutch television shows
NPO 2 original programming
Ornithology
Bird flight
Bird migration